The 8th Infantry Regiment, later the 8th Infantry Regiment of the Duke of Kaunas Vaidotas was an infantry regiment that served in the Lithuanian Army during the Interwar period.

1919 
The regiment was founded on 12 May 1919 as the Ukmergė Infantry Battalion. From August to December 1919, the battalion fought against the Bolshevik Red Army from Salakas to Daugpilis. On December 10, the battalion was reorganized into the 8th Regiment.

1920 
On 16 February 1920, the regiment was given the name of Vaidotas, the Duke of Kaunas. Soon thereafter, on February 21–23, the regiment quelled the Mutiny of the Kaunas garrison. Thereafter, the regiment guarded the demarcation line with Poland. In July and August 1920, two of the 8th regiment's battalions guarded the demarcation line to the south of Trakai against Red Army units during the Polish–Soviet War. From 2 to 23 September 1920, the regiment fought against the Polish Army in the Battle of Suvalkai. Then, during Żeligowski's Mutiny, the regiment fought in the Battle of Giedraičiai.

Klaipėda Revolt 
In 1923, the regiment's soldiers partook in the Klaipėda Revolt. The company, led by Lieutenant , broke through the entire city to the French Commissioner's prefecture, where the company commander was killed. However, the prefecture was occupied and the French surrendered.

Interwar 
In 1921, after the battles against the Poles ceased, the regiment was stationed in Šėta, and then moved to the permanent dislocation in Šiauliai.  On 29 July 1929, the regiment was given the flag with the inscription of "" (May Bravery, Endurance and Love of the Fatherland lead us). 

The regiment was part of the 3rd Infantry Division. The regiment had two battalions, totalling about 1,100 soldiers. The regiment's commander was also the commander of the Šiauliai garrison.

Soviet occupation and disbandment 
The 5th Infantry Regiment of the Lithuanian Grand Duke Kęstutis was renamed to 5th Infantry Regiment on 25 July 1940, following Lithuania's occupation by the Soviet Union. Finally, the regiment was disbanded on October 27.

Regimental commanders 
 1919 – officer 
 1921 – Colonel 
 1921 – Colonel 
 1924 – Colonel 
 1926 – Colonel 
 1927 – Colonel 
 1934–1940 – Colonel -Butkevičius

References

Sources 

 
 
 

Military units and formations established in 1919
Military units and formations disestablished in 1940
Infantry regiments of Lithuania